This is a list of the heritage sites in Swellendam and Riversdale, situated in the Western Cape, as recognized by the South African Heritage Resources Agency.

|}

References 

Swellendam
Heritage lists
Heritage lists